Dr. R. Senthil (born 2 June 1962) is an Indian politician affiliated to the Pattali Makkal Katchi party.Mr. Senthil is running a hospital named THANGAM HOSPITAL in Dharmapuri. He is taking care of kidney stone problems. An expert for kidney stones with low cost.   was a member of the 14th Lok Sabha of India. From 2004 to 2009, he represented the Dharmapuri constituency of Tamil Nadu in the Lok Sabha.

References

External links
 Members of Fourteenth Lok Sabha - Parliament of India website

Living people
Pattali Makkal Katchi politicians
1962 births
India MPs 2004–2009
Lok Sabha members from Tamil Nadu
People from Dharmapuri district
Politicians from Chennai